Eduardo Pallasim Guinle (Porto Alegre, 18 March 1846 – Rio de Janeiro, 10 March 1912) was a Brazilian businessman and the patriarch of the Guinle family.

Origin 
Eduardo was the son of Jean-Arnauld Guinle and Josephine Désirée Bernardine Palassin, who were French immigrants from the region of the Hautes-Pyrénées who immigrated to Uruguay and then to Brazil.

Companhia Docas de Santos 
In 1888, the businessmen Eduardo Palassin Guinle, Francisco de Paula Ribeiro and Cândido Gaffrée received a 92-year concession to the port of Santos from Isabel, Princess Imperial of Brazil, where they founded the Companhia Docas de Santos during the golden age of coffees exports in Brazil.

When he died in 1912, Eduardo Pallasim Guinle left an estimated fortune of 20 billion dollars in today's money.

Legacy 
There is a road named after him in Botafogo, Rio de Janeiro. There is also a road with the name of his wife (Rua Guilhermina Guinle) and a bust dedicated to Eduardo in Copacabana Palace.

References

People from Porto Alegre
1846 births
1912 deaths
Brazilian people of French descent
19th-century Brazilian businesspeople
20th-century Brazilian businesspeople
Brazilian exporters
Brazilian business executives